The Canterbury Railway Society is an organisation of railway enthusiasts based in the Canterbury region of New Zealand's South Island, best known for their operation of The Ferrymead Railway at the Ferrymead Heritage Park.

Beginnings
The Canterbury branch of the New Zealand Railway & Locomotive Society was formed in the late 1950s. In its early years, one of its major activities was in the operation of passenger excursions on the national rail network, then operated by the New Zealand Railways Department. In that era, there were far more excursion trains than there are today, and far more railway lines in general, including the many branch lines that were closed in the 1960s and 1970s. Steam traction was used in the South Island for longer than in the North Island, and a variety of motive power could be found on any of these trains.

Aside from a handful of locomotives placed on public display, little thought up to this time had been given to any serious notion of rail preservation. The catalyst proved to be the wholesale scrapping of steam traction which began in the mid 1950s and continued until 1971 when the last JA class locomotives were withdrawn from the Main South Line. In addition at this time, a large number of branch lines were closed and ripped up, and some of the earliest preservation efforts were based on these closed lines, while others took advantage of the opportunity to obtain cheap supplies of recovered rail materials for use elsewhere.

The idea of becoming involved in railway preservation in New Zealand did not become a reality for any group in New Zealand until the 1960s, when New Zealand Railways accelerated the pace of dieselisation, resulting in wholesale scrapping of its steam locomotive fleet. At that time, there was a nationwide move to save railway equipment which resulted in the large-scale purchase of locomotives and rolling stock and the establishment of the major preservation sites in New Zealand.

Ferrymead Railway

The Ferrymead Railway has been the main project of the Canterbury branch since 1964. The railway has been established on the historical site of New Zealand's first public railway which opened in 1863 and closed in 1867. Work on the site had progressed sufficiently far by 1972 to allow train running to begin, and the railway officially opened in 1977. It was the major focus of 1988's Rail 125 commemorations, a celebration of 125 years of railways in New Zealand, and it has hosted numerous local events since, often in conjunction with the Ferrymead Heritage Park or other rail preservation societies.

Other activities
As noted above, excursion trains were a major early activity of the Canterbury branch. It also held monthly members' meetings, often on railway premises, and organised special conventions and festivals. In the diesel era, the most notable of these was the aforementioned Rail 125. Passenger shuttle services and excursions operated daily throughout the week of this festival, which was attended by locomotives, rolling stock and railfans from all around the country. Following the reintroduction of excursions to the NZR mainline in the late 1970s, the branch or individual members operated a number of diesel hauled trains, and were well placed to take advantage of the reintroduction of mainline steam in the mid 1980s.

Changes in New Zealand Railway & Locomotive Society (NZRLS) membership rules in 1984 resulted in the elimination of membership of Local Branches of the NZRLS. When the requirement for full membership of the parent society began to be enforced there was a move for the Canterbury Branch to follow the lead of the former Auckland, Wellington and Otago branches and form a separate Society. Constitutional amendments were passed in 1990 which resulted in the branch becoming the independent Canterbury Railway Society.

During the 1990s, the restructuring and privatisation of New Zealand Railways had a major impact upon the activities of many rail societies. Excursion train costs rose substantially and the number of such trains operated annually dropped off dramatically. Such trains then became mainly the preserve of two or three larger organisations with their own passenger carriage and/or locomotive fleets. Changes in employment law and working patterns for most New Zealand citizens resulted also in a major reduction in voluntary resources for groups all around the country. In general, this has resulted in most other activities of the Canterbury Railway Society dropping away, and the Society is now exclusively based at Ferrymead and forms most of its activities around the site.

Locomotives, railcars and rolling stock

Ex-NZR Steam locomotives

Ex-Industrial steam locomotives

NZR diesel locomotives

In addition:
 In October 2013 Dunedin Railways DJ 1209 took part for the NZ Rail 150 celebrations at Ferrymead.

Electric locomotives

In addition:
In June 1998, a year after the end of the Otira electrification EOs 45 and 74 were leased to the CRS for storage and display in June 1998. In November 1999 EOs 39, 51 and 68 were transferred to Ferrymead as well. 45, 68 and 74 operated at the park ark on a number of times occasions including Easter Weekend in 2000. Three of the EOs were moved to Picton in 2004 while the other two stayed until 2008.

Railcars

Electric multiple units

Carriages

In addition:
The underframe of A 272 and another unidentified 'A' car are in storage.

Vans

Gallery

References

External links
 Ferrymead Railway website
 NZR Locomotives
 New Zealand Rolling Stock Register
 NZR Rolling Stock Lists 
 CRS - Gallery

Rail transport in Christchurch
Railway societies
Organizations established in 1990
1990 establishments in New Zealand